"Britannia Rag" is an instrumental that was written 
and recorded by Winifred Atwell in 1952. It was written for the 1952 Royal Variety Performance, and peaked at number 5 on the UK Singles Chart, and spent a total of six weeks in the top 12.

References

1952 singles
1952 songs
1950s instrumentals